Whose Shout was a weekly live variety hour television program produced by RMITV that broadcast on C31 Melbourne. The show was a reboot of Under Melbourne Tonight set in an old pub called the Stumpy Arms and had game elements like What's Goin' On There?. Tony Biggs, Stephen Hall and Vin "Rastas" Hedger played the role of bar tenders and Joel McLean played the role of race caller. Special guest punters included Adam Richard, Dave Hughes, Rod Quantock, Peter Helliar and many more. The show also featured music performances from artists such as Fred Negro.

Cast

References

Television shows set in Victoria (Australia)
Australian community access television shows
English-language television shows
1999 Australian television series debuts
1999 Australian television series endings
RMITV productions